Inna Alexandrovna Lasovskaya (born 17 December 1969) is a retired triple jumper from Russia. She won a gold medal at the 1994 European Athletics Indoor Championships, ahead of compatriot and world record holder Anna Biryukova. In 1996 she jumped past the 15-metre mark for the first time (15.08 in Madrid) and won an Olympic silver medal. In 1997 she won the World Indoor Championships, and the same year in Valencia she jumped 15.09 metres, which remains her personal best.

International competitions

See also
List of Olympic medalists in athletics (women)
List of 1996 Summer Olympics medal winners
List of IAAF World Indoor Championships medalists (women)
List of European Athletics Championships medalists (women)
List of European Athletics Indoor Championships medalists (women)
Triple jump at the Olympics

References

1969 births
Living people
Athletes from Moscow
Russian female triple jumpers
Russian female long jumpers
Olympic female triple jumpers
Olympic athletes of Russia
Olympic silver medalists for Russia
Olympic silver medalists in athletics (track and field)
Athletes (track and field) at the 1996 Summer Olympics
Athletes (track and field) at the 2000 Summer Olympics
Medalists at the 1996 Summer Olympics
World Athletics Championships athletes for Russia
World Athletics Indoor Championships winners
European Athletics Championships medalists
European Athletics Indoor Championships winners
Russian Athletics Championships winners